East Amherst is a Canadian rural community located in northwestern Cumberland County, Nova Scotia near the border with New Brunswick, located on Trunk 6, immediately east of the Town of Amherst's municipal boundary.

The community is mostly small mixed-use farms, although an increasing number of homes are being constructed as Amherst experiences a small case of suburban sprawl.

Communities in Cumberland County, Nova Scotia